Nekrasovsky (masculine), Nekrasovskaya (feminine), or Nekrasovskoye (neuter) may refer to:
Nekrasovsky District, a district of Yaroslavl Oblast, Russia
Nekrasovsky (inhabited locality) (Nekrasovskaya, Nekrasovskoye), several inhabited localities in Russia

See also
Nekrasov
Nekrasovka